is a Japanese swimmer. She competed in the women's 1500 metre freestyle event at the 2018 Asian Games, winning the bronze medal. She qualified to represent Japan at the 2020 Summer Olympics.

References

External links
 

2000 births
Living people
Japanese female freestyle swimmers
Place of birth missing (living people)
Asian Games medalists in swimming
Asian Games silver medalists for Japan
Asian Games bronze medalists for Japan
Swimmers at the 2018 Asian Games
Medalists at the 2018 Asian Games
Universiade medalists in swimming
Universiade gold medalists for Japan
Swimmers at the 2020 Summer Olympics
Olympic swimmers of Japan
Medalists at the FINA World Swimming Championships (25 m)
21st-century Japanese women